11 Squadron  was a World War II squadron of the South African Air Force.  It was created in South Africa in 1939 and served in East Africa until 1941 as an army cooperation and reconnaissance squadron.  It was re-formed in 1944 as a fighter bomber squadron and served in Italy until 1945 when it returned to Egypt and was disbanded on conclusion of the war on 30 October 1945.  It was re-activated in 1974, flying Cessna 185s as an army liaison squadron until 1991 when it disbanded for the final time.

History
11 Squadron served in two periods during World War II, in East Africa and again later in Egypt and Italy.  It was formed on 11 December 1939 at Waterkloof Flying Station equipped with 24 Hawker Hartbees in an army co-operation role, moving to Kenya in May 1940. The squadron received its first Fairey Battle in June 1940 and by 19 August all of the Hartbees aircraft had been replaced by Fairey Battles deployed from Archers Post in Kenya. It served in a reconnaissance and army cooperation role in Italian Somaliland and Ethiopia until June 1941 when its aircraft were transferred to 15 Squadron and 11 Squadron was disbanded.

The squadron was re-formed on 29 June 1944 at Almaza in Egypt flying Mk.VB and Mk.VC Spitfires in the role of fighter squadron.  It was moved to Edku in July 1944 and to Perugia in Italy in September 1944 – where it exchanged the Spitfires for Curtiss Kittyhawk Mk.IVs as part of the Desert Air Force.  In Italy, the squadron was part of No.8 (S.A.A.F.) Wing responsible for ground-attack and fighter-bomber sweeps in support of the armies in Italy until the end of the war.

In August 1945 the squadron received Spitfire Mk.IXs and was transferred back to Egypt, where it remained until being disbanded on 30 October 1945.

It was resurrected in January 1974 as a liaison and army cooperation squadron equipped with Cessna 185s and based at Potchefstroom Air Base.  It was finally disbanded in 1991.

Aircraft

Notes and References
Footnotes

Citations

Squadrons of the South African Air Force
Military units and formations established in 1939
Military units and formations disestablished in 1991